Huazhou may refer to:

Huazhou, Guangdong, a county-level city in Guangdong
Huazhou District, a district in Weinan, Shaanxi
Huazhou Subdistrict, Weinan, subdivision of Huazhou District
Huazhou Subdistrict, Guangzhou (zh), subdivision of Haizhu District, Guangzhou, Guangdong
Huazhou Subdistrict, Dengzhou, subdivision of Dengzhou, Henan
Hua Zhou (zh), Chinese folk singer.

Historical prefectures
Hua Prefecture (Shaanxi), a historical prefecture in modern Shaanxi between the 6th and 20th centuries
Hua Prefecture (Henan), a historical prefecture in modern Henan between the 6th and 14th centuries
Hua Prefecture (Guangdong), a historical prefecture in modern Guangdong between the 10th and 20th centuries

See also
Hua (disambiguation)